Dolly Guleria (born 14 April 1949) is an Indian vocalist, primarily a folk singer in Punjabi with expertise in Punjabi Folk, Shabad Gurbani, Sufi and Ghazal genres of Music. She is the daughter of Professor Jogindra Singh and the legendary folk singer Surinder Kaur, popularly known as 'The Nightingale of Punjab'.

Career
Guleria aspired to be a doctor, being a medical student. In 1970 she married Army Officer Col. S.S.Guleria and had a daughter, Sunaini Sharma, and two sons, Dilpreet Singh and Amanpreet Singh. After settling down with motherhood she was encouraged by her husband to continue her training in classical music on getting an opportunity to become the disciple of a very learned Ustad, 'Khan Sahib’
Abdul Rehman Khan, of 'Patiala Gharana' who trained her in the field of classical music as the foundation with specific aptitude to implement the same in light classical and folk singing.

Devotionally inclined since childhood, under the able guidance of her Ustad, she chose to release her solo debut album in Gurbani in Ragas and sang "Rehraas Sahib" the evening 'Paath' in its original ragas. Subsequently, albums were released of Punjabi folk songs, some with her mother and some solo including Shabad Kirtan, the poetry of Shiv Kumar Batalvi, Bhai Veer Singh and other renowned writers.

She has also contributed her voice as a playback singer in Punjabi films such as Rab Dian Rakhaan, Deson Pardes and Main Maa Punjab Di.

Recognition
During her goodwill and cultural exchange visit to Pakistan in November 1997 she and her daughter Sunaini Sharma enthralled the audience of Pakistan at the Gaddafi Stadium, Lahore and in Faisalabad (Lyallpur) at the Chenab Club with her music. She was honoured with a golden plaque of Minar-e-Pakistan and a Gold Medal her outstanding contribution.

Personal life
She enjoys live performances and the immediate response of the audience boosts her morale. She wishes to make sincere efforts to keep the Punjabi music alive in its purest form. She is teaching music to dedicated students who are enrolled in her Nightingale Music Academy.

See also
Surinder Kaur
Parkash Kaur
Asa Singh Mastana
List of Punjabi singers

References 

Living people
Indian women folk singers
Indian folk singers
Singers from Punjab, India
Women musicians from Punjab, India
20th-century Indian women singers
20th-century Indian singers
1949 births